The 1928 Railway Cup Hurling Championship was the second series of the inter-provincial hurling Railway Cup. Two matches were played between 12 February and 17 March 1928. It was contested by Connacht, Leinster and Munster.

Leinster entered the championship as the defending champions.

On 17 March 1928, Munster won the Railway Cup after a 2-02 to 1-02 defeat of Leinster in the final at Croke Park, Dublin. This was their first Railway Cup title.

Teams

Results

Semi-final

Final

Sources

 Donegan, Des, The Complete Handbook of Gaelic Games (DBA Publications Limited, 2005).

Railway Cup Hurling Championship
Railway Cup Hurling Championship